Tactusa constrictor is a moth of the family Erebidae first described by Michael Fibiger in 2010. It is known from southern Laos, in Southeast Asia.

Description
The wingspan is about 9 mm.

The forewing is relatively short and broad. The ground colour is whitish, with a basal-costal patch and a dorso-medial triangular patch. It is white between the basal and antemedial lines, and between the triangular patch and subterminal line.

The subterminal and terminal areas, including the fringes are blackish brown, except for the large white costal patch. The crosslines are invisible and the terminal line is dotted and weakly marked.

The hindwing is white, with an indistinct discal spot and the underside is unicolorous grey.

References

Micronoctuini
Taxa named by Michael Fibiger
Moths described in 2010
Moths of Asia